Jahleel Billingsley is an American football tight end who most recently played for the Texas Longhorns of the Big 12 Conference.

Early life and high school
Billingsley grew up in Chicago, Illinois, and attended Wendell Phillips Academy High School, where he played football and basketball. He played multiple positions for the Wildcats including tight end, receiver, wildcat quarterback and defensive line. Billingsley was rated a four-star prospect and committed to play college football at Alabama over offers from Auburn, Florida, LSU, Michigan and Ohio State. He was the first Alabama recruit from the state of Illinois since 1997.

College career
Bilingsley played in nine games with two receptions for 16 yards as a freshman. He caught 18 passes for 287 yards and three touchdowns as the Crimson Tide won the 2021 College Football Playoff National Championship. Billingsley also led the team with 89 kick return yards. 

Billingsley was moved down the depth chart prior to the start of the 2021 season. When coach Nick Saban was asked about it after the team’s first game against Miami, he said Saban said, “Jahleel and I have talked on several occasions because he’s certainly a guy that we want to have success for his own benefit individually, as well as for the team. Sometime when you get a little external encouragement it can be a positive for you.” Billingsley caught a 26-yard touchdown pass in the Crimson Tide's 31-29 win in Week 3 over 11th-ranked Florida and returned to the starting lineup the following game against Southern Miss.

Billingsley ended the 2021 season with 17 receptions for 256 yards and three touchdowns in 13 games.

On January 11, 2022, Billingsley entered the transfer portal after not catching a pass during the CFB Championship for Alabama. Then on January 16, it was announced that Billingsley would be transferring to Texas to play with former Alabama Offensive Coordinator, Steve Sarkisian

Collegiate statistics

Source:

References

External links
Alabama Crimson Tide bio

Living people
American football tight ends
Alabama Crimson Tide football players
Texas Longhorns football players
Players of American football from Chicago
2001 births